This is a list of the National Register of Historic Places listings in Floyd County, Iowa.

This is intended to be a complete list of the properties and districts on the National Register of Historic Places in Floyd County, Iowa, United States. Latitude and longitude coordinates are provided for many National Register properties and districts; these locations may be seen together in a map.

There are 20 properties and districts listed on the National Register in the county.

Current listings

|}

Former listings
One listing in Floyd county has been removed from the Register:

|}

See also

 List of National Historic Landmarks in Iowa
 National Register of Historic Places listings in Iowa
 Listings in neighboring counties: Bremer, Butler, Cerro Gordo, Chickasaw, Franklin, Howard, Mitchell

References

Floyd
 
Buildings and structures in Floyd County, Iowa